Lenny Jacobson (born June 11, 1974) is an American actor best known for his recurring role as Wayne Cobb in the Apple TV+ original science fiction space drama series For All Mankind.

Life and career
Born and raised in Holyoke, Massachusetts, Jacobson attended Blessed Sacrament School and Holyoke Catholic High School. He went on to spend a year at Roger Williams University in Bristol, RI, where he was a member of the men's basketball team.

He moved to Los Angeles in 2001 to pursue a career in acting and got his start booking various commercials, including Budweiser and Castrol.

In 2009, Jacobson earned a small role in the pilot for the Showtime series Nurse Jackie, which later became a major recurring role, appearing in 25 episodes over the next 4 seasons. During this time, Jacobson also worked on several other series including NCIS, Southland (TV series), Law & Order: LA, and Rizzoli & Isles.

His career continued with roles on TV's CSI, Shameless and Modern Family, and in feature films like Celeste & Jesse Forever and the 2013 Steve Jobs biopic Jobs, starring Ashton Kutcher, Josh Gad, and J. K. Simmons.

Following his final season on Nurse Jackie, Jacobson shared with his cast-mates a Screen Actors Guild Award nomination for Outstanding Performance by an Ensemble in a Comedy Series, his first major nomination.

In August 2013, Deadline Hollywood announced that Jacobson would be starring in Comedy Central pilot Big Time in Hollywood, FL, which was then ordered to series in January 2014.  The series only lasted ten episodes and was confirmed by Jacobson himself that there would not be another season.

In 2016, Jacobson portrayed a role in Blumhouse Productions' The Veil, alongside Jessica Alba and Thomas Jane.

Since 2019, Jacobson has portrayed Wayne Cobb, husband of NASA Astronaut Molly Cobb, in the Apple TV+ original science fiction space drama series For All Mankind.

Filmography

Film

Television

References

External links

Living people
1974 births
Male actors from Massachusetts
People from Holyoke, Massachusetts